| tries = {{#expr:
 8 + 3 + 4 + 3 + 3 + 6
 + 2 + 6 + 7 + 4 + 2 + 4
 + 2 + 8 + 4 + 2 + 3 + 5
 + 3 + 5 + 4 + 3 + 6 + 4
 + 1 + 5 + 6 + 4 + 5 + 7
 + 5 + 7 + 4 + 7 + 8 + 7
 + 6 + 7 + 3 + 2 + 6 + 3
 + 7 + 6 + 4 + 11 + 10 + 9
 + 4 + 3 + 4 + 6 + 6 + 7
 + 4 + 6 + 2 + 7 + 5 + 3
 + 5 + 9 + 4 + 7 + 2 + 9
 + 5 + 6 + 2 + 6 + 9 + 4
 + 2 + 6 + 4 + 11 + 9 + 5
 + 2 + 8 + 5 + 7 + 1 + 6
 + 7 + 8 + 6 + 7 + 4 + 8
 + 2 + 6 + 2 + 8 + 6 + 2
 + 7 + 6 + 10 + 10 + 10 + 5
 + 6 + 6 + 3 + 7 + 7 + 7
 + 8 + 9 + 8 + 5 + 8 + 8
 + 14 + 4 + 10 + 7 + 8 + 5
 + 6 + 7 + 8 + 5 + 6 + 10
 + 6 + 6 + 4 + 7
 + 9 + 5
 + 2
}}
| top point scorer = Rhys Priestland (Bath)(206 points)
| top try scorer = Ollie Thorley (Gloucester),Ben Earl (Saracens & Bristol)(11 tries)
| website    = www.premiershiprugby.com
| prevseason = 2018–19
| nextseason = 2020–21
}}

The 2019–20 Gallagher Premiership was the 33rd season of the top flight English domestic rugby union competition and the second one to be sponsored by Gallagher. The reigning champions entering the season were Saracens, who had claimed their fifth title after defeating Exeter Chiefs in the 2019 final. London Irish had been promoted as champions from the 2018–19 RFU Championship at the first attempt.

Highlights of each weekend's games were shown on Channel 5 with extended highlights on BT Sport.

Summary
Exeter Chiefs won their second title after defeating Wasps in the final at Twickenham having also topped the regular season table. Saracens were automatically relegated after having failed to comply with prior years salary cap restrictions and were deducted a total of 105 points across two separate judgements. It was the second time that Saracens have been relegated from the top flight since the leagues began and the first time since the 1992–93 Premiership Rugby season.

Due to changes to the global rugby calendar and the COVID-19 pandemic, this season started and finished later than previous seasons and including the Premiership Rugby Cup, ran for 58 weeks in total.

On 5 November 2019, Premiership Rugby announced that Saracens would be deducted 35 points in the 2019–20 season and fined £5.3 million due to undisclosed payments to players in previous seasons. Saracens initially said they would appeal the ruling, but on 18 November announced that they accepted the punishments, with the deduction leaving them 26 points adrift at the bottom of the table. After further failure to comply with the salary cap, Saracens were announced to be automatically relegated at the end of the season on 18 January 2020 despite relegation not being an available sanction in the salary cap regulations. On 28 January 2020 this was confirmed with the application of a further 70 point deduction.

On 16 March 2020, the league was suspended for an initial five week period due to the COVID-19 pandemic. Resumption was originally scheduled for the weekend of 24/25/26 April but was later postponed indefinitely. The restart eventually took place on 14 August, with all games played behind closed doors and broadcast live on BT Sport. Channel 5 also broadcast 5 matches.

Teams
Twelve teams compete in the league – the top eleven teams from the previous season and London Irish who were promoted from the 2018–19 RFU Championship after a top flight absence of one year. They replaced Newcastle Falcons who were relegated after six years in the top flight.

Stadiums and locations

Preseason
The 2019 edition of the Premiership Rugby Sevens Series was held at Franklin's Gardens on 13 and 14 September 2019. For the third successive year all twelve Premiership teams would feature in one venue over two days. Teams would be split into four pools of three which played each other once in a round-robin basis with the tournament splitting into Cup and Plate competitions on the second day.

In a repeat of the 2018 final, Saracens beat Wasps 35–19 to win the 2019 Premiership Sevens Cup. Gloucester beat Sale Sharks to win the Plate. It was the third successive year Wasps had made the cup final of the competition.

Table

Fixtures
Fixtures for the season were announced by Premiership Rugby on 10 July 2019. Due to the Rugby World Cup, the first round of matches commenced during the fifth week of the season, following four rounds of the Premiership Cup. The London Double Header does not feature after being discontinued last year.

Highlights of the season included:
 Big Game 12 - Harlequins hosted Leicester Tigers in this season's edition of the Big Game at Twickenham on 28 December 2019.

All fixtures are subject to change.

Regular season

Round 1

Round 2

Round 3

Round 4

Round 5

Round 6

Round 7

Round 8

Round 9

Round 10

Round 11

Round 12

Round 13

Following round 13, the league was suspended until 14 August due to the COVID-19 pandemic in England.

Round 14

Round 15

Round 16

Round 17

Round 18

Round 19

Round 20

Round 21

Round 22

Play-offs
As in previous seasons, the top four teams in the Premiership table, following the conclusion of the regular season, contest the play-off semi-finals in a 1st vs 4th and 2nd vs 3rd format, with the higher ranking team having home advantage. The two winners of the semi-finals then meet in the Premiership Final at Twickenham on 24 October 2020.

Bracket

Semi-finals

Final

Leading scorers
Note: Flags indicate national union as has been defined under WR eligibility rules. Players may hold more than one non-WR nationality.

Most points

Source:

Most tries

Source:

Season attendances

By club

 Attendances only include matches up to the suspension of fixtures in March 2020. After this matches were played behind closed doors, or as part of the trialled return of spectators with attendance limited to 3,500 or 1,000.

Highest attendances

Notes

References

External links
 

 
2019-20
 
England